Martina Hingis and Jana Novotná were the defending champions, but none of them competed this year. Novotná also retired at the end of the 1999 season.

Julie Halard-Decugis and Ai Sugiyama won the title by defeating Nicole Arendt and Manon Bollegraf 4–6, 7–5, 6–4 in the final. It was the 9th title for Halard-Decugis and the 12th title for Sugiyama in their respective careers. It was also the 2nd title for the pair during the season, after their win in Sydney.

Seeds
A champion seed is indicated in bold text while text in italics indicates the round in which that seed was eliminated. All sixteen seeds received a bye to the second round.

Draw

Finals

Top half

Section 1

Section 2

Bottom half

Section 3

Section 4

References
 Official Results Archive (ITF)
 Official Results Archive (WTA)

Women's Doubles